Amity may refer to:

Places

United States
 Eagar, Arizona, a town, formerly named Amity
 Amity (New Haven), Connecticut, a neighborhood
 Amity, Georgia, an unincorporated community
 Amity, Illinois (disambiguation)
 Amity, Indiana, an unincorporated community
 Amity, Maine, a town
 Amity, Missouri, a village
 Amity, New York, a town
 Amity, Orange County, New York, a hamlet
 Amity, Knox County, Ohio, an unincorporated community
 Amity, Madison County, Ohio, an unincorporated community
 Amity, Montgomery County, Ohio, an unincorporated community
 Amity, Oregon, a city
 Amity, Bucks County, Pennsylvania, an unincorporated community
 Amity, Washington County, Pennsylvania, an unincorporated community
 Amity, Texas, an unincorporated community
 Amity Hills, Oregon, range of hills northeast of Amity
 Amity Township (disambiguation)

Australia
 Amity, Queensland, a town on North Stradbroke Island, Redland City

Schools
 Amity University (disambiguation), several universities in India
 Amity Law School (disambiguation)
 Amity Business School, a private business school in India
 Amity College, New South Wales, Australia
 Amity High School (disambiguation), several schools
 Amity International School (disambiguation)
 Amity School, in Lincolnton, Georgia
 Brooklyn Amity School, a private school in Brooklyn, New York, United States
 AEON-Amity, a chain of private English schools in Japan

Other uses
 Amity Blight, character in the Disney animated series The Owl House
 Amity (1801 ship), a merchant ship, Royal Navy sloop and whaler
 Amity (brig), a ship used in Australia in the early nineteenth century
 Amity (given name), a list of people with the name
 Amity, New Farm, a heritage-listed house in Brisbane, Queensland, Australia
 Amity Church Settlement, settlement house in New York City
 Amity Foundation, a charity in China
 Amity Street, Amherst, Massachusetts
 Amity Island, a town and the island in the Jaws franchise
 Amity, one of the five factions in the Divergent series

See also 
 Amityville (disambiguation)